Beat Me Up may refer to:

 "Beat Me Up", a song from Just Like You (Allison Iraheta album), 2006
 "Beat Me Up", a song from Afraid of Heights (Wavves album), 2013

See also
 Beat Me, a 2006 album by Electric Eel Shock
 Beat It Up (disambiguation)
 Beat You Up (disambiguation)